The West Liberty Hilltoppers, also previously known as the West Liberty State Hilltoppers, are the athletic teams that represent West Liberty University, located in West Liberty, West Virginia, in NCAA Division II intercollegiate sports. The Hilltoppers compete as members of the Mountain East Conference for all sports.

Prior to 2012, West Liberty was a member of the West Virginia Intercollegiate Athletic Conference, of which the Hilltoppers were an original founding member from 1924.

Varsity teams

List of teams

Men's sports (9)
 Baseball
 Basketball
 Cross Country
 Football
 Golf 
 Soccer
 Tennis
 Track and field
 Wrestling

Women's sports (9)
 Acrobats and tumbling
 Basketball
 Cross country
 Golf
 Soccer
 Softball
 Tennis
 Track and field
 Volleyball

National championships

Team

References

External links